The Monterey Peninsula Country Club (MPCC) is a 36-hole golf club on the West Coast of the United States, located on the Monterey Peninsula in Pebble Beach, California.

History
On February 1, 1919, Samuel F. B. Morse formed the Del Monte Properties and purchased extensive real estate holdings on the Monterey Peninsula. He hired East Coast architects, Charles B. Macdonald and his associate, Seth Raynor to design the Dunes course in 1924. Raynor died in 1926 before construction was complete. Golf designer Robert Hunter was called in to finish out the construction of the course.

On January 19, 1925, a Charter for the Monterey Peninsula Country Club was granted by the state of California. A month later, an organizational meeting was called and Samuel F. B. Morse was elected president of the newly formed club. 

On February 19, 1925, there were 68 charter members of the Monterey Peninsula Country Club. Formal opening of the new country club was on July 2, 1926, with over 300 at the grand opening.

The Shore Course was designed by Bob E. Baldock and Jack Neville in 1959 after the members purchased the club from Del Monte Properties.

Bruce Harris redesigned the Shore course in 1962, and it was later redesigned in 2003 by Mike Strantz.

In 2010, the Shore course returned to the rotation of the AT&T Pebble Beach Pro-Am, a PGA Tour event founded by entertainer Bing Crosby and played on three courses. The Dunes course hosted the event from 1947 to 1964 and the Shore course hosted in 1965, 1966, and 1977.

References

External links
 
Monterey Peninsula Country Club Course information with photos and interactive map.

Golf clubs and courses in California
Sports venues in Monterey County, California
Pebble Beach, California